Kristof Calvo y Castañer (born 30 January 1987) is a Belgian politician. He is a member of the Flemish left-wing green party. At the moment he is a federal representative. Since 2014, Calvo is parliamentary group leader of Groen in the federal Chamber of Representatives. Since January 2013, he has been a councillor in Mechelen.

Calvo was born in Rumst to a Spanish Catalan father, himself born in Barcelona but who migrated to Belgium with his family in 1960,  and a Belgian mother. At home the family spoke Dutch and Kristof declared to the Barcelona's newspaper La Vanguardia in 2010 that he doesn't have enough vocabulary to speak Spanish and Catalan. He doesn't have the Spanish nationality.  In 2010, at the age of 23, he became the youngest direct-elected representative in Belgian history.

During the controversy over the Belgian federal government's attitude towards the 2017 Spanish constitutional crisis, Kristof Calvo took a moderate attitude: condemnation of the violences by the Spanish police against Catalans but pleading for a dialogue between Madrid and the Catalans.

References

External links
 
 

1987 births
Living people
Belgian people of Spanish descent
People from Rumst
Groen (political party) politicians
Members of the Belgian Federal Parliament
21st-century Belgian politicians